Kanye Adventist Hospital is a  Christian health facility located in Kanye, a town in southern Botswana, located  south-west of the capital  Gaborone. Kanye is the administrative centre of the Southern District. Kanye is the traditional capital of the Ngwaketse tribe, who first settled in the area in the 1790s. The hospital has 167 beds.

References

Hospitals in Botswana
Hospitals affiliated with the Seventh-day Adventist Church